Marica Josimčević (Serbian-Cyrillic: Марица Јосимчевић; born 12 May 1946 in Belgrade, SFR Yugoslavia) is a Serbian  writer and translator.

Biography
Marica Josimčević grew up in his native place, attended the Ninth Belgrade Gymnasium in New Belgrade city quarter and graduated with maturity diploma in 1965, then she began studying Spanish and English languages and literatures at the Philosophical Faculty of Belgrade's University and graduated  with diploma in 1969. After her studies, she worked as translator for Aviogenex (1970–73) and Energoprojekt (1973-1980). During these years, she travelled to Latin America and spent some time in Colombia (1973), Panama (1974) and Mexico (1980). She started her career as freelance writer in 1980, and from 1993 to 2001, she worked as literary editor for the publishing companies DBR  and Verzal Press in Belgrade, which no longer exist today. Josimčević is one of the editors, who compiled the complete works of Isidora Sekulić, first edited by Stylos publishing Novi Sad from 2001-2004, she is translator of works by Mario Vargas Llosa, Samael Aun Weor, Carlos Fuentes, Pío Baroja, Manuel Scorza, Reinaldo Arenas and Rómulo Gallegos as well as the History of Latin American Literature (Historia de la literatura hispanoamericana) by Gerardo Mario Goloboff and Juan Octavio Prenz into Serbian. Josimčević's work is influenced by spiritualism, mysticism, esotericism, symbolism and Magic realism.

Works
Dno na vrhu sveta (Abyss on Top of the World), novel, DBR Publishing, Belgrade 1994, .
Škorpion je znao (Scorpio Knew It), short stories, Prosveta, 1989, .
Postaja gospodnja (Retreat of Lord), novel, Altera, Belgrade 1991, .
Put kože  (Way of Skin), short stories, Srpska književna zadruga,  Belgrade 1998, .
Jovanje : knjiga o drugom postanju (Jovanje: Book of Second Creation), Pešić i sinovi, Belgrade 2003, .
Dvoboj na mostu (Duel on the Bridge) short stories, Utopija, Belgrade 2007, .
Botaničar : drama u četiri čina, trinaest dana i četrdeset i četiri scene (The Botanist: a drama in four acts, thirteen days and forty-four scenes), novel, Luks Mundi Press, Belgrade 2010, .
Abyss on Top of the World, English self-publication, CreateSpace Independent Publishing 2009 and 2012, .
Ogledalo ljudskog roda (Mirror of Mankind), Pešić i sinovi, Belgrade 2013.
Drezga, monograph (Serbian and English), Radionica duše, Belgrade 2014 and 2016, .
Plavi zdenac (Blue Well), Metaphysica, Belgrade 2016, .

Awards
Isidora Sekulić Award 1998 for Put kože
Stevan Pešić Award 1998 for Put kože

References

1946 births
Living people
University of Belgrade Faculty of Philology alumni
Writers from Belgrade
Serbian novelists
Serbian women short story writers
Serbian short story writers
Serbian translators
Literary translators
Translators to Serbian
Translators from Spanish
Serbian women novelists